Hadsel is a municipality in Nordland county, Norway. It is part of the traditional district of Vesterålen. The administrative centre of the municipality is the town of Stokmarknes. Other villages in Hadsel include Fiskebøl, Gjerstad, Grønning, Grytting, Hanøyvika, Hennes, Kaljord, Melbu, Sanden, and Sandnes.

The municipality is the southernmost municipality in the Vesterålen region. It is spread over several main islands: Hadseløya, Børøya, Hinnøya, Langøya, and Austvågøya. About 70% of the population live on Hadseløya island. Hadseløya island is connected to Langøya by the Hadsel Bridge and Børøy Bridge. Also, the Stokmarknes Airport, Skagen, is located nearby. It is the busiest small aircraft airport in Norway, serving 100,000 passengers annually (1997).

The  municipality is the 192nd largest by area out of the 356 municipalities in Norway. Hadsel is the 130th most populous municipality in Norway with a population of 8,107.

The municipality is surrounded by several other municipalities: Sortland lies to the north, Bø to the west, Vågan to the south, and Lødingen to the east.

Part of the municipality is called Innlandet [the inland], consisting of the villages Kaljord, Hennes, Kvitnes, Kvantoelv and Fiskfjord.

Economy: In Spring 2022, a company started mining of cryptocurrency at the company's facility in Stokmarknes; later that year the municipality decideded to cancel the business permit, and informed the company; as of Q1 2023, the business can continue its operation; an estimate has been made about how much electrical power the facility uses: around 40% of the power consumed (in the municipality), from the electric grid.

History
Hadsel was established as a municipality on 1 January 1838 (see formannskapsdistrikt law). The northern district of Hadsel was separated in 1841 to form the new Sortland Municipality. During the 1960s, there were many municipal mergers across Norway due to the work of the Schei Committee. On 1 January 1963, the Indre Eidsfjord district of Hadsel (population: 1,360) was transferred to Sortland municipality.

Name
The municipality (originally the parish) is named after the old Hadsel farm since the first Hadsel Church was built there. (A cliff near the farm has been compared in form to a sail.)

Coat of arms
The coat of arms was granted on 11 March 1976. The official blazon is "Azure, four annulets Or, two and two". This means the arms have a blue field (background) and the charge is four rings (two over two). The charge has a tincture of Or which means it is commonly colored yellow, but if it is made out of metal, then gold is used. The blue color in the field symbolizes the importance of sea for this island municipality. The four rings represent the four main islands of that make up Hadsel: Hadseløya, Austvågøya, Hinnøya, and Langøya. The arms were designed by Øystein Bottolfsen.

Churches

The Church of Norway has three parishes within the municipality of Hadsel. It is part of the Vesterålen prosti (deanery) in the Diocese of Sør-Hålogaland.

Geography
The municipality is located upon four main islands in the Vesterålen archipelago:  Hinnøya, Langøya, Hadseløya, and Austvågøya, plus the small islands of Børøya and Brottøya. The mountain Higravstinden on the border with Vågan is one of the tallest mountains in the region.

Climate
Hadsel has a subpolar oceanic climate (Cfc). Stokmarknes Airport, Skagen in Hadsel has recorded temperature since June 1972. Data for extremes available since 2004, there might be warmer or colder temperatures recorded before 2004.

Government
All municipalities in Norway, including Hadsel, are responsible for primary education (through 10th grade), outpatient health services, senior citizen services, unemployment and other social services, zoning, economic development, and municipal roads. The municipality is governed by a municipal council of elected representatives, which in turn elect a mayor.  The municipality falls under the Vesterålen District Court and the Hålogaland Court of Appeal.

Municipal council
The municipal council of Hadsel is made up of 25 representatives that are elected to four year terms. The party breakdown of the council is as follows:

Mayors
The mayors of Hadsel (incomplete list):

1872–1878: Sofus Arctander
(unknown period): Carl Martin Ellingsen
1919-1928: K. L. Leknes (V)
1928-1931: Håvard Hanssen
1934-1937: O. Fjellstad (Ap)
1945-1945: Olav Dahl
1959-1967: Edmund Fjærvoll (KrF)
1968-1971: Bjarne Bendiksen (Ap)
1972-1972: Egil Karlsen (V)
1972-1973: Trygve Pettersen (Ap)
1974-1975: Elnar Bårdsen (Ap)
1975-1979: John Kristiansen (H)
1979-1985: Dag Jostein Fjærvoll (KrF)
1985-1987: Ingegjerd Solum (Ap)
1987-1999: Hugo Olsen (Ap)
1999-2003: Ørjan Robertsen (Ap)
2003-2007: Reidar Johnsen (Sp)
2007-2015: Kjell-Børge Freiberg (FrP)
2015-2019: Siv Dagny Aasvik (Ap)
2019–2021: Kurt Eirik Jenssen (Sp)
2021-present: Aina Johanne Nilsen (Sp)

Notable people 
 Øyvinn Øi (1901 in Hadsel – 1940) a Norwegian military officer killed at the outbreak of WWII
 Asbjørn Herteig (1919 in Hadsel – 2006) an archeologist, first curator at the Bryggen Museum
 Maren-Sofie Røstvig (1920 in Melbu – 2014) a Norwegian literary historian.
 Henry Valen (1924 in Hadsel – 2007) a Norwegian political scientist and academic
 Lars Andreas Larssen (1935 in Melbu – 2014) a Norwegian stage, film and television actor 
 Oddbjørn Knutsen (1953 in Hadsel – 2019) a Norwegian political scientist and academic
 Kjell-Børge Freiberg (born 1971 In Hadsel) a Norwegian politician, Govt. Minister and Mayor of Hadsel 2007 to 2015

References

External links
Municipal fact sheet from Statistics Norway 

Pictures from Hadsel

 
Municipalities of Nordland
Populated places of Arctic Norway
1838 establishments in Norway